Heello was an online social networking service and microblogging service launched in August 2011, and owned and operated by Heello Inc. Heello enabled its users to send and read text-based posts and to share pictures and videos. Heello was founded by Noah Everett (the founder of Twitpic), exactly one day after Twitter rolled out its official photo-sharing app. Heello is financed by the money generated by TwitPic through online advertising.
Within the first day, there were about average 4 Pings a second. On 12 August 2011, Noah Everett reported that Heello had reached 1 million Pings in just 2 days.

, the Heello API had not been released, and developers were trying to create applications/tools using alternative ways.

On 8 August 2012, the Heello team announced via Twitter that they were working on a new version of the website The link new.heello.com that they Tweeted on their Twitter account and Pinged from their website mentioned the development of mobile applications for the iPhone and Android platforms.

A post from their blog  stated that the new version's main features were going to be:
a simple user interface that focused on the user's timeline
inline photos and videos in timelines
native check-in functionality backed by a global database of over 58 million places
a big focus on their developer ecosystem
users would own their data

On the 12th of January 2013, Heello launched its new, updated web service to over 1 million Heello users. The new update included Private Pings, header photos (similar to those of Facebook or Twitter), as well as a cleaner, slimmer design and an improved API. These changes were widely welcomed throughout the Heello user base and were admired for their modern design. Although it still had an ample number of errors throughout the platform, the company said it was working to help pull Heello back to its feet, and after 4 days of launching the new Heello, it said that it had over 65% of its user base back on and Pinging.

On June 23, 2014 the Heello team announced that Heello would be shutting down on August 15, 2014. A link was provided to request an archive of user data. Heello was no longer available after June 24, 2014.

It was unofficially re-created in Russia after 2014 under the address https://heello.ru.

Citations

References 
 
 
 
 

Defunct social networking services